Gladys Lucy Tejeda Pucuhuaranga (born 30 September 1985 in Jauja, Junín) is a Peruvian long-distance runner.

Biography
She competed in women's marathon at the 2012 Summer Olympics. Further she was selected as Peru's flag-bearer for the 2012 Summer Olympics Parade of Nations.

In 2013, she finished as champion in the XXXI edition of the Mexico City Marathon with a time of 2:37:35. She finished in third place at Pan-American Games, in Guadalajara, 2011.

In 2015, she won the Marathon Gold Medal in the Pan American Games, setting a new Pan-American record of 2:33:05. A few weeks after the games, Julio César Maglione, president of the Pan American Sports Organization announced that Gladys Tejeda tested positive for doping, which she denied.

On September 10, 2015, she has been stripped of her gold medal by the Committee who said in a statement  that Tejeda had tested positive for furosemide, a diuretic on the World Anti-Doping Agency's banned list because it is used to mask other drugs. The statement said that Tejeda would be temporarily suspended from international competition.

On August 14, 2016, Tejeda was ranked 15th in Women's Marathon in the Rio 2016 Olympics with a time of 2:29:55.

In 2017, she finished as champion again in the XXXV edition of the Mexico City Marathon with a time of 2:36:16 setting the women's course record for the event.

She won a gold medal at the 2019 Pan American Games in the Marathon event.

Personal bests
5000 m: 16:00.91 min –  Lima, 15 June 2013
10,000 m: 33:01.99 min –  Stanford, California, 4 May 2014
Half marathon: 1:10:14 hrs –  Cardiff, 26 March 2016
Marathon: 2:28:12 hrs –  Rotterdam, 12 April 2015

Achievements

See also 
 List of doping cases in athletics

References

External links

1985 births
Doping cases in athletics
Living people
People from Junín Region
Peruvian female long-distance runners
Peruvian female marathon runners
Olympic athletes of Peru
Athletes (track and field) at the 2012 Summer Olympics
Pan American Games medalists in athletics (track and field)
Athletes (track and field) at the 2011 Pan American Games
Athletes (track and field) at the 2015 Pan American Games
Athletes (track and field) at the 2019 Pan American Games
Pan American Games gold medalists for Peru
Pan American Games bronze medalists for Peru
Peruvian sportspeople in doping cases
Athletes (track and field) at the 2016 Summer Olympics
Athletes (track and field) at the 2018 South American Games
South American Games silver medalists for Peru
South American Games medalists in athletics
National University of San Marcos alumni
Pan American Games gold medalists in athletics (track and field)
Medalists at the 2011 Pan American Games
Medalists at the 2019 Pan American Games
Athletes (track and field) at the 2020 Summer Olympics
21st-century Peruvian women